Michael P. Sullivan (born 1934) is an American attorney and former President of Dairy Queen.

Career
Sullivan is a graduate of Marquette University and University of Minnesota Law School and former Naval officer. Sullivan practiced business and franchise law at Gray Plant Mooty for 25 years prior to becoming the CEO of Dairy Queen, including 10 years as the firm's managing officer.

Sullivan guided Dairy Queen from 1987 to 2001, and battled McDonald's, Wendy's, and Burger King in the fast food market.  He also resolved internal problems with Dairy Queen distributors.  Sullivan sold Dairy Queen to Warren Buffett and Berkshire Hathaway in 1998.   

Sullivan also served as a Director of The Valspar Corporation from 1990 to February 2005. In 2005, he was named the Opus Distinguished Chair in Family Business at the University of St. Thomas College of Business. Sullivan currently serves as Director of Allianz Life Insurance Co. of North America and Adler Trust Company.

References 

Minnesota lawyers
American chief executives of food industry companies
Marquette University alumni
University of Minnesota Law School alumni
1934 births
Living people